is a Japanese footballer currently playing as a midfielder for Vonds Ichihara.

Club career
Hashimoto signed for J3 League side YSCC Yokohama from Tokyo 23 FC, ahead of the 2022 season.

On 14 January 2023, Hashimoto was announced as a new signing for KSL club Vonds Ichihara, coming from YSCC Yokohama ahead of the 2023 season.

Career statistics

Club
.

Notes

References

External links

1998 births
Living people
Niigata University of Health and Welfare alumni
Japanese footballers
Association football defenders
J3 League players
Tokyo 23 FC players
YSCC Yokohama players
Vonds Ichihara players